The 2000 Daytona 500, the 42nd running of the event, was held February 20, 2000 at Daytona International Speedway in Daytona Beach, Florida as the first race of both the 2000 NASCAR Winson Cup season and the 2000s decade. Dale Jarrett, the polesitter, led the most laps and won the race for the third time, after winning in 1993 and 1996. This was (to date) the last Daytona 500 to be televised by CBS and thus the last 500 broadcast for both Buddy Baker and Ned Jarrett. Dave Marcis failed to qualify for the first time in his Daytona 500 career, a streak that had been going since the 1968 running.

The average green flag run for the race was confirmed by NASCAR officials as 29 laps. About 12% of the event was held under a caution flag, mostly for oil, debris, and accidents.

Qualifying and Gatorade 125s

Dale Jarrett won the pole for the race with a speed of just over 191 mph, and started alongside his new teammate Ricky Rudd in an all-Robert Yates front row. A total of 57 drivers made an attempt to qualify for the 42nd Daytona 500. Bill Elliott won the first Gatorade 125 qualifying race after taking the lead from Jarrett on lap 1 and leading all 50 laps. Rudd won the second Gatorade duel after leading all 50 laps also. Both Gatorade 125 races were caution-free.

Tony Stewart and Robby Gordon stole headlines during Speedweeks on Wednesday during practice for the Gatorade Twin 125's when Stewart spun Gordon. Robby Gordon, who was trying to practice his new #13 self-owned team in the race, confronted Stewart in the garages and asked Stewart about the spin. Stewart shoved Gordon as he turned away to walk off, leading to a fist-fight. Security broke them up. Stewart was fined $15,000 by NASCAR for the shove.

Drivers qualified for the Daytona 500 either by finishing in the Top 16 in their qualifying race, through a two-lap qualifying run or a provisional starting spot based on owner points from the 1999 season. They had three chances to make a two-lap time trial run that would be fast enough to make the Daytona 500.

Race summary
The green flag waved at 12:15 pm as pole-sitter Dale Jarrett led the field to the start of the race. However, he did not lead until lap 5 since he lost the first lap to outside polesitter Ricky Rudd. Mike Skinner took the lead away from Rudd on lap 2 and led two more. Bill Elliott briefly took the lead on lap 34, and then Jarrett regained it just before the first caution came out due to oil on a section of the track. The next green flag period lasted nearly 100 laps, in which Mark Martin took the lead and remained there for 65 laps. The second caution (also for oil) came on lap 134 and the third one came out on lap 157. During the latter caution, Johnny Benson Jr., who didn't get a sponsor until the morning of race day, passed Martin for the lead as the lead-lap cars raced back to the yellow flag.

Benson Jr. led the next 39 laps, which included yet another caution on lap 170, once again for oil. On lap 192, several drivers, including Michael Waltrip, Elliott Sadler, and John Andretti, were involved in a crash right at the start-finish line. The race restarted with four laps to go, and Benson Jr. looked as if he might capture his first cup series win in the biggest event of the season when the Fords of Jarrett and Jeff Burton ganged up on and passed him entering turn 3. One lap before the white flag was scheduled, Jimmy Spencer hit the front stretch wall, which allowed the final lap to be run under caution, securing a third Daytona 500 win for Jarrett, making him the fourth driver to win three or more Daytona 500s. As of 2021, this was the last time the Daytona 500 was won by the polesitter.

Including the No Bull 5 Million Dollar Bonus, Jarrett earned a record payout of $2,277,975. The last-place finisher earned $90,100.

The five drivers going for the No Bull 5 Million Dollar Bonus were the top five finishers from the 1999 Winston 500 at Talladega: Dale Jarrett, Ricky Rudd, Ward Burton, Dale Earnhardt, and Kenny Wallace.

The 2000 Daytona 500 was heavily criticized due to the racing that took place. The racing saw a total of 6 cautions for 24 laps and had a total of 9 lead changes and 7 different leaders in that event. Two-time Daytona 500 winning crew chief Larry McReynolds, who was the crew chief of Mike Skinner, after the race said "They're thinking about building more seats here. They oughta build cots 'cause this stuff is going to put everyone to sleep!" 1998 Daytona 500 champion and seven-time Winston Cup Series champion Dale Earnhardt shared his displeasure with the state of the event to interviewers immediately post-race:

After the race, NASCAR made a decision to change its entire plate package to improve the racing.

Results

References

External links 

Daytona 500
Daytona 500
NASCAR races at Daytona International Speedway